

Hinrich Schuldt (14 January 1901 – 15 March 1944) was a German SS commander during World War II. He was a posthumous recipient of the Knight's Cross of the Iron Cross with Oak Leaves and Swords of Nazi Germany.

SS Brigade Schuldt
SS Brigade Schuldt, under Schuldt's command, was composed of units drawn from the SS Division Leibstandarte, SS Division Das Reich, SS Polizei Division and a detachment from the Luftwaffe. The brigade was moved to the Eastern Front in December 1942, and by 16 December was sent to the Stalingrad front. On 1 January 1943, it was placed under command of the 6th Panzer Division. The brigade was disbanded on 1 March 1943, with what was left of its units returning to their parent formations. The 1st SS-Polizei Panzegrenadier Regiment 7 was left with 84 men from original 527 and the 7th Battalion LSSAH had 38 men left from original 800.

Awards
 Iron Cross (1939) 2nd Class (24 October 1939) & 1st Class (October 1941)
German Cross in Gold on 21 April 1943 as SS-Standartenführer in the SS-Brigade "Schuldt"
Knight's Cross of the Iron Cross with Oak Leaves and Swords
 Knight's Cross on 5 April 1942 as SS-Obersturmbannführer and commander of SS-Infanterie-Regiment 4 "Reichsführer-SS".
 Oak Leaves on 2 April 1943 as SS-Standartenführer and commander of SS Brigade Schuldt
 Swords on 25 March 1944 (posthumously) as SS-Oberführer and commander of the  2. lettische SS-Freiwilligen-Brigade

References

Citations

Bibliography

Nafziger George, Waffen SS and Other Units in World War II: The German Order of Battle, 
 
 
 

1901 births
1944 deaths
SS-Brigadeführer
Recipients of the Gold German Cross
Recipients of the Knight's Cross of the Iron Cross with Oak Leaves and Swords
Military personnel from Hamburg
People from the Province of Schleswig-Holstein
Waffen-SS personnel killed in action
Reichsmarine personnel
Waffen-SS personnel